Edward "Ted" Wilfred Odell, Jr. (15 March 1947, in Pleasantville, New York – 9 January 2013, in Houston, Texas) was an American mathematician, specializing in the theory of Banach spaces.

Odell received in 1969 in his B.S. degree from the State University of New York at Binghamton and in 1975 his Ph.D. degree from the Massachusetts Institute of Technology under William Buhmann Johnson. From 1975 to 1977 Odell was a Josiah Willard Gibbs Instructor at Yale University. He became in 1977 an assistant professor, in 1981 an associate professor, and in 1990 a full professor at the University of Texas at Austin. He was the author or coauthor of 84 articles.

In 1994 Odell was an Invited Speaker of the ICM in Zurich. In 2012 he was elected a Fellow of the American Mathematical Society.

Selected publications
with W. B. Johnson: "Subspaces and quotients of lp⊕l2 and Xp." Acta Mathematica 147, no. 1 (1981): 117–147. 
with Richard Haydon and Mireille Levy: On sequences without weak* convergent convex block subsequences. Proc. Amer. Math. Soc. 100 (1987), 94–98 
with Thomas Schlumprecht: "The distortion problem." Acta Mathematica 173, no. 2 (1994): 259–281. 
with Th. Schlumprecht: Asymptotic properties of Banach spaces under renormings. J. Amer. Math. Soc. 11 (1998), 175–188 
with Th. Schlumprecht: Trees and branches in Banach spaces. Trans. Amer. Math. Soc. 354 (2002), 4085–4108 
with Hans-Olav Tylli: Weakly compact approximation in Banach spaces. Trans. Amer. Math. Soc. 357 (2005), 1125–1159 
with B. Sari, Th. Schlumprecht, and B. Zheng: Systems formed by translates of one element in Lp(ℝ). Trans. Amer. Math. Soc. 363 (2011), 6505–6529

References

1947 births
2013 deaths
20th-century American mathematicians
21st-century American mathematicians
Binghamton University alumni
Massachusetts Institute of Technology alumni
University of Texas at Austin faculty
Fellows of the American Mathematical Society